Army United Football Club was a Thai football club under the stewardship of Royal Thai Army based in the Din Daeng District of Bangkok and is one of the oldest continuing football club in Asia until they decided to discontinue the club in the end of season 2019 after 103 years in existence. The club was founded in 1916 and was known as Royal Thai Army until November 2010. Their home stadium is known locally as the Thai Army Sports Stadium and more widely known around Asian circles as the Royal Thai Army Stadium of which has been host to numerous international youth matches due to its central Bangkok location. The club play in red shirts with red shorts and red socks. Despite finishing bottom of the Thai Premier League in 2010 they managed to regain their top-flight status after winning Group B of the Thai League Play-off in 2011.

History
Army United represents the Royal Thai Army and has traditionally been Thailand's yo-yo club along with the Navy and Police clubs. Up until 2010 and the name change from the Royal Thai Army to Army United, the club lacked support and had dwindling crowds, mainly supported by Army personnel shipped in for the games.

The Army team has always been a mid ranking Thai team with their biggest successes coming in the Thai Division 1 League with a championship in the 2004–05 season and 2nd place in 2009. Both of these successes have of course come after relegation from the Thai League.

The club are based in the Din Daeng District of Central Bangkok, which is the area that bases the Royal Thai Army. Up until the 2011 season, the club operated a policy of only playing homegrown talent but ditched this as the game became more professional and foreign players were brought into the team. Previously the players would work for the Army during the week and play football on weekends, somewhat different from most clubs who operated on a full-time basis.

In the 2010 season, they were reprieved from relegation after an end of season relegation/playoff system was announced to expand the Thai Premier League. They came 16th in that season and in a normal season they would have been relegated.

In 2011, rebranded Army United signed five Brazilians and surprised all expectations as they topped the TPL in the early weeks of the season. Crowds rose from a few hundred hardy souls to a season average of 5,580. Leandro Dos Santos was hitting the back of the net regularly yet the early season form petered out and Army finished in 13th position.

In 2012, most of the Brazilians had moved on but were replaced with other highly rated foreign stars. Daniel Blanco was the most impressive performer as Army flirted with the Top 6 for long periods before eventually finishing in 10th position.

The 2012 season also coincided with Army reaching the 2012 Thai FA Cup final. On the way to the final, Army was given a reprieve after they'd lost a penalty shoot-out to regional league side Trat. It turned out that Trat had fielded an unregistered player and was booted out of the cup with Army reinstated. Army United then took the scalp of runaway TPL leaders Muangthong United on the way to the final. The final itself was rather disappointing for the club with Army losing 2–1 to Buriram United.

In 2013, the club signed a strategic partnership deal with Thai-owned English club Leicester City.

In 2019, Army United decided to dissolved the club end the history of the club with 103 years.

Stadium

Thai Army Sports Stadium is a multi-purpose stadium on Vibhavadi-Rangsit Road in the Din Daeng District of north Bangkok, Thailand.  It is currently used mostly for football matches and is the home stadium of Army United F.C. The stadium holds 20,000 and has a single stand with covered seating on one side and terracing on three sides. An athletics track surrounds the pitch. It is often used by Thai club sides in international football competitions and was used by Bangkok University in the 2007 AFC Champions League and Osotsapa in the 2007 AFC Cup. Additionally, it has been used for matches involving national sides in international tournaments hosted by Thailand where the hosts are not involved.

Stadium and locations by season records

Season by season domestic record

P = Played
W = Games Won
D = Games Drawn
L = Games Lost
F = Goals for
A = Goals Against
Pts = Points
Pos = Final Position
N/A = No answer

TPL = Thai Premier League
TL = Thai League 1

QR1 = First Qualifying Round
QR2 = Second Qualifying Round
QR3 = Third Qualifying Round
QR4 = Fourth Qualifying Round
RInt = Intermediate Round
R1 = Round 1
R2 = Round 2
R3 = Round 3

R4 = Round 4
R5 = Round 5
R6 = Round 6
GR = Group stage
QF = Quarter-finals
SF = Semi-finals
RU = Runners-up
S = Shared
W = Winners

Coaches
Coaches by Years (1996–2019)

Honours
Domestic competitions
 Thai Division 1 League 
 Winner (1): 2004–05 
 Thai FA Cup 
 Runner-up (1): 2012
 Kor Royal Cup 
 Winner (1): 1983
 Queen's Cup 
 Runner-up'' (1): 1997

References

External links
  
 Army United at Thai Premier League

 
Football clubs in Thailand
Association football clubs established in 1916
Thai League 1 clubs
Sport in Bangkok
1916 establishments in Siam
Military association football clubs in Thailand